Mithat Bayrak (3 March 1929 – 20 April 2014) was a Turkish sports wrestler and trainer, who won two consecutive gold medals in the Welterweight class of Men's Greco-Roman Wrestling at the 1956 Olympics and 1960 Olympics.

Born on 3 March 1929 in Adapazarı of Sakarya Province, he began 1948 the wrestling sport in Sakarya Güneş Spor club. Following his admission to the national team, he was trained     by the renowned wrestlers Gazanfer Bilge, Mehmet Oktav, Hüseyin Erkmen and Celal Atik. Mithat Bayrak won the gold medal twice for Turkey at the Olympic Games.

He ceased his international career after the 1960 Olympics and emigrated to Germany, where he joined the wrestling sports club  KSV Witten 07. There, he wrestled almost 20 years more and served later also as trainer.

After the end of his career, he ran a restaurant in Witten, Germany.

Achievements
 1955 Mediterranean Games in Barcelona, Spain - 4th (Greco-Roman Welterweight)
 1956 Summer Olympics in Melbourne, Australia - gold (Greco-Roman Welterweight)
 1958 World Wrestling Championships in Budapest, Hungary -  10th (Greco-Roman Middleweight)
 1959 Wrestling Tournament in Savona, Italy - gold (Greco-Roman Middleweight)
 1959, Wrestling Tournament in Split, Yugoslavia - silver (Greco-Roman Welterweight) 
 1959 Mediterranean Games in Beirut, Lebanon - silver (Greco-Roman Welterweight)
 1959 Balkan Wrestling Championships in Istanbul, Turkey - silver (Greco-Roman Middleweight)
 1960 Summer Olympics in Rome, Italy - gold (Greco-Roman Welterweight)

External links
 

1929 births
2014 deaths
Sportspeople from Adapazarı
Wrestlers at the 1956 Summer Olympics
Wrestlers at the 1960 Summer Olympics
Wrestlers at the 1964 Summer Olympics
Turkish male sport wrestlers
Olympic gold medalists for Turkey
Olympic medalists in wrestling
Medalists at the 1960 Summer Olympics
Medalists at the 1956 Summer Olympics
Mediterranean Games silver medalists for Turkey
Competitors at the 1959 Mediterranean Games
Mediterranean Games medalists in wrestling
20th-century Turkish people
21st-century Turkish people